Tammis Keefe (1913 – June 5, 1960) was an American textile designer.

Biography 
Keefe was born Margaret Thomas in 1913. She began her studies in mathematics at Los Angeles Community College. After a trip to Chicago to see the 1933-1934 World's Fair, she changed her major to art at the  Chouinard Art School in Los Angeles. After graduation, she became the Art Director of Arts and Architecture magazine during World War II.

By 1948, Keefe was working as a textile designer for Dorothy Leibis Studio in New York City which textile designs to the furnishings firm, Goodall Industries. She also created freelance designs for other home decorative lines and wallpaper for various firms. Later, she began designing handkerchiefs commissioned by J. H. Kimball for Lord & Taylor in New York. Keefe was best known for her bright colors playful designs on handkerchiefs, kitchen towels and scarves.

On June 5, 1960, she died of cancer.

Her work can be found at The Metropolitan Museum of Art, the Cooper Hewitt and the Museum at the Fashion Institute of Technology.

References 

1913 births
1960 deaths
Los Angeles Community College alumni